Erin Taylor-Talcott (born May 21, 1978) is an American racewalker. She competed in the women's 50 kilometres walk event at the 2017 World Championships in Athletics held in London, United Kingdom.

Born and raised in the Greater Portland area, she attended Clackamas High School. She earned a degree in music performance from Rutgers University and a masters in music performance from Stony Brook University.

References

Further reading 
 
 
 
 Interview at Racewalk.com
 Interview at ROLL Recovery

External links 
 
 
 

1978 births
Living people
American female racewalkers
World Athletics Championships athletes for the United States
21st-century American women
Rutgers University alumni
Stony Brook University alumni
Place of birth missing (living people)